Lisa G. Aspinwall is an American researcher and professor of Social Psychology and Health Psychology at the University of Utah. In 2000, she was honored as 2nd place recipient of the John Marks Templeton Positive Psychology Prize for her work on optimism and psychological resilience.

Education
Aspinwall received her B.A. in psychology in 1987 from Stanford University, with honors and with distinction. She went on to earn her M.A. and PhD (both in social psychology) from UCLA, in 1988 and 1991, respectively.

Career
Aspinwall served at University of Maryland as an assistant professor (1991–1997) and later an associate professor (1997–2000) of psychology, where she received the Certificate of Teaching Excellence. She then transitioned to the University of Utah, where she served as an associate professor (2000–2013), professor (2013-present) and department chair (2015–2018).

Research
Aspinwall's main body of research is related to cancer patients. She has published articles on genetic testing for cancer prevention, as well as the effects of positive psychology on cancer survivors.

References

Year of birth missing (living people)
Living people
American women academics
American women psychologists
21st-century American psychologists
Cancer researchers
Stanford University School of Humanities and Sciences alumni
University of California, Los Angeles alumni
University of Utah faculty
21st-century American women